Charlotte Wynters (December 4, 1899 – January 7, 1991) was an American stage and film actress.

Biography
A native of Wheeling, West Virginia, Wynters appeared as a leading lady in a number of B pictures during the 1930s.

During the 1922-1923 theatrical season, Wynters headed a stock company at the Lyceum Theatre in Paterson, New Jersey. In the 1929-1930 season, she acted with a troupe at the Adelphi Theater in Philadelphia. On Broadway, Wynters appeared in Bad Girl (1930), The Wiser They Are (1931), A Regular Guy (1931), Air Minded (1932), and Her Tin Soldier (1933).

On November 22, 1939, Wynters married actor Barton MacLane in Beverly Hills. She was also married to Charles Schall.

Filmography

References

External links
 
 

1899 births
1991 deaths
American stage actresses
American film actresses
Actors from Wheeling, West Virginia
20th-century American actresses
Broadway theatre people